Events from the year 1741 in Wales.

Incumbents

Lord Lieutenant of North Wales (Lord Lieutenant of Anglesey, Caernarvonshire, Flintshire, Merionethshire, Montgomeryshire) – George Cholmondeley, 3rd Earl of Cholmondeley 
Lord Lieutenant of Glamorgan – Charles Powlett, 3rd Duke of Bolton
Lord Lieutenant of Brecknockshire and Lord Lieutenant of Monmouthshire – Thomas Morgan
Lord Lieutenant of Cardiganshire – John Vaughan, 2nd Viscount Lisburne
Lord Lieutenant of Carmarthenshire – vacant until 1755
Lord Lieutenant of Denbighshire – Sir Robert Salusbury Cotton, 3rd Baronet 
Lord Lieutenant of Pembrokeshire – Sir Arthur Owen, 3rd Baronet
Lord Lieutenant of Radnorshire – James Brydges, 1st Duke of Chandos

Bishop of Bangor – Thomas Herring 
Bishop of Llandaff – John Gilbert
Bishop of St Asaph – Isaac Maddox
Bishop of St Davids – Nicholas Clagett

Events
June - In the general election, the seat of Sir Watkin Williams-Wynn, 3rd Baronet at Denbighshire is targeted by the government.  Sir Watkin wins by 1352 to 933, but the sheriff, a member of the Salusbury family, disallows 594 of his votes and returns a cousin of Salusbury, John Myddelton of Chirk. Sir Watkin is elected for Montgomeryshire instead.
Carpenter Siarl Marc is converted and quickly becomes the most important Calvinistic Methodist exhorter in the Llyn peninsula.
Lewis Morris resumes his survey of Welsh ports on behalf of the Navy Office.

Arts and literature

New books
Evan Davies - Newyddion Mawr Oddiwrth y Ser (vol. 3)

Music
Morgan John Lewis - Hymnau Duwiol o Gasgliad Gwyr Eglwysig M.J. ac E.W.
David Owen composes Dafydd y Garreg Wen on his deathbed, according to tradition

Births
27 January - Hester Thrale, diarist and friend of Dr Johnson (died 1821)
20 August - Henry Herbert, 1st Earl of Carnarvon (died 1811)
3 September - Owen Jones, antiquary (died 1814)

Deaths
May - Isaac Carter, publisher
August - David Owen, 29 ("David of the White Rock"), harpist
date unknown
Wil Hopcyn, poet, 41?
Edward Owen, artist
Robert Roberts, theologian, 61?

References 

Wales
Wales